Dhakkiwala Mohra is a town in the Islamabad Capital Territory of Pakistan. It is located at 33° 24' 45N 73° 17' 20E with an altitude of 531 metres (1745 feet).

References 

Union councils of Islamabad Capital Territory